Carnerillo is a village located in the Juárez Celman Department in the Province of Córdoba in central Argentina. It is located on the RN 158,  from the city of Río Cuarto. The main economic activity is livestock and agriculture.

References

Populated places in Córdoba Province, Argentina